Paulus Ali Nuumbembe (born 24 June 1978 in Oshakati, Oshana Region, Namibia) is a Namibian welterweight boxer. Nicknamed "The Silent Assassin", Nuumbembe is a former Commonwealth champion who represented Namibia at the 2000 Summer Olympics and the 2002 Commonwealth Games.

Rise to Prominence

Nuumbembe came to prominence in April 2005, when he fought to a points draw with undefeated British Champion David Barnes in a challenge for the vacant WBO Inter-Continental welterweight title.

Commonwealth title
The biggest moment of his career came when he earned a points victory over Scotland's unbeaten Kevin Anderson to win the Commonwealth Welterweight title. 
He was the first Commonwealth Champion from Namibia.

Return to Namibia
Nuumbembe lost the title due to a cut, against Craig Watson on December 8, 2007. 
In 2008, after spending much of his boxing life in Britain, Nuumbembe made the decision to move back to Namibia. He has since gone on to win the WBA Pan African welterweight title and Namibian Title.

Nuumembe is now a Major in the Namibian Defence Force and is currently training their boxers.

References

1974 births
Living people
Boxers at the 2000 Summer Olympics
Boxers at the 2002 Commonwealth Games
Commonwealth Games bronze medallists for Namibia
Olympic boxers of Namibia
People from Oshana Region
Namibian military personnel
Namibian male boxers
Commonwealth Games medallists in boxing
Welterweight boxers
Medallists at the 2002 Commonwealth Games